The DB Class 82 was a goods train tank locomotive with the Deutsche Bundesbahn in Germany, that was built in the period after the Second World War and was intended for shunting and normal rail services. They were to replace the ten-coupled state railway (Länderbahn) engines and also the accident-prone Class 87 DRG Einheitslok (standard locomotive).

It was the first of the DB's so-called Neubaudampflokomotiven or newly designed steam locomotives, and was built by the firms of Krupp and Henschel in 1950 and 1951 and also by the Maschinenfabrik Esslingen in 1955. Although they were ten-couplers, the 41 engines were also suitable for lines with tight curves such as the Hamburg Harbour railway. To improve curve running the first and last axles were fitted with Beugniot levers. The last two examples were also equipped with Riggenbach counterpressure brakes, which enabled their operation on steep lines. The locomotives were able to haul 800 tonne trains at up to 70 km/h.

Deployment 
The engines were predominantly employed in the marshalling yards at Bremen and Hamm as well as on the harbour lines of Emden and Hamburg. The 82s could also be seen on normal railway duties on the steep inclines of the Westerwald and in the Black Forest on the Murg Valley Railway.

Retirement began as early as 1966, the final locomotive depot being Bw Koblenz-Mosel, where the last one was mustered out in 1972 .

Preserved 
Locomotive 82 008, the last existing example of its class, has been looked after in Bw Neumünster since early 2003 by the Rendsburger Eisenbahnfreunden.

See also
 List of DB locomotives and railbuses

References

External links 
 Class 82 (German)
 Rendsburger Eisenbahnfreunde site
 Photograph and technical data

82
0-10-0T locomotives
082
Krupp locomotives
Henschel locomotives
Railway locomotives introduced in 1950
Standard gauge locomotives of Germany
E h2t locomotives
Freight locomotives